Drigh Lake is situated in Qambar Shahdadkot District in Sindh, Pakistan,   from Larkana city and  from Qambar town. Formed in the floods of 1814, 1815 and 1817.
  
Drigh Lake is a favorable area for resident and winter migratory birds like night heron, grey heron, purple heron, great white egret, little egret, mallard, gadwal, pintail, shoveller, common teal, tufted duck, wigeon, osprey, marsh harrier, white breasted kingfisher, pied kingfisher, small blue kingfisher, purple galinule, white-breasted waterhen, moorhen, cormorant, common pochard, pied harrier, crow pheasant, darter, garganey, ferruginous duck, greater spotted eagle, moorhen, marbled teal and coot.

Drigh Lake was declared a wildlife sanctuary in 1972 and was designated as a Ramsar site recognized by the united nation as A World Heritage site in 1976.

References

Ramsar sites in Pakistan
Lakes of Sindh
Marine parks of Pakistan
Qambar Shahdadkot District
Protected areas of Sindh